Wierna rzeka is a Polish historical film directed by Leonard Buczkowski, based on a novel by Stefan Żeromski. It was released in 1936.

Cast
Barbara Orwid 
Jadwiga Andrzejewska
Amelia Rotter-Jarnińska 
Mieczysław Cybulski 
Franciszek Brodniewicz 
Kazimierz Junosza-Stępowski 
Józef Węgrzyn 
Józef Orwid 
Jerzy Leszczyński 
Stanisław Sielański 
Jerzy Rygier 
Zygmunt Chmielewski

References

External links
 

1936 films
Polish historical drama films
1930s Polish-language films
1930s historical drama films
Films based on Polish novels
Films based on works by Stefan Żeromski
Polish black-and-white films
1936 drama films